Rincon Valley (Arizona) is a valley in Pima County, Arizona that is surrounded on the north, east and south by the Rincon Mountains.

References 

Valleys of Arizona